The Moluccan hanging parrot (Loriculus amabilis) is a species of parrot in the family Psittaculidae. It is endemic to forest and nearby habitats on Halmahera, Bacan and Morotai in Indonesia. It has sometimes included the Sula hanging parrot as a subspecies, but the two are increasingly treated as separate species based on their distinct differences in plumage and size (11 cm for the Moluccan hanging parrot versus 14 cm for the Sula hanging parrot).

References

External links
Oriental Bird Images: Moluccan Hanging Parrot  Selected photos

Moluccan hanging parrot
Birds of the Maluku Islands
Moluccan hanging parrot
Taxonomy articles created by Polbot